Le Monastier-Pin-Moriès is a former commune in the Lozère département in southern France. On 1 January 2016, it was merged into the new commune of Bourgs-sur-Colagne.

Geography
The Colagne flows southward through the eastern part of the commune, forms part of its south-eastern border, then flows into the Lot, which forms part of the commune's southern border.

See also
Communes of the Lozère department

References

Monastierpinmories